Coeliadinae is a subfamily of the skipper butterfly family (Hesperiidae). With about 150 described species, this is one of several smallish skipper butterfly subfamilies. It was first proposed by William Frederick Evans in 1937.

The subfamily is restricted to the Old World tropics. It comprises the most basal living lineage of skippers. In Coeliadinae the second segment of the palpi is erect and densely scaled, and the third segment is perpendicular to it, long, slender and without scales.

Genera
There has only been limited phylogenetic study of this subfamily, and several issues still need to be resolved. For example, the genus Burara is here included in Bibasis, because they are both not monophyletic if their traditional delimitation is maintained. However, they may well consist of two different lineages, but where to draw the line between them and what name to use for the second genus all remain to be determined.

In the provisional phylogenetic sequence, the genera of Coeliadinae are: 
 Allora
 Pyrrhiades
 Pyrrhochalcia – African giant skipper
 Badamia
 Bibasis – awlets (including Burara)
 Hasora – awls
 Choaspes
 Coeliades – policemen

Footnotes

References
  (2009): Tree of Life Web Project – Coeliadinae. Version of 2009-JUN-11. Retrieved 2009-DEC-24.

External links

Flickr

 
Taxa named by William Frederick Evans
Butterfly subfamilies